Jeremy Hazin (born February 27, 2000) is a Canadian table tennis player.

Career
Hazin became the youngest Canadian player to compete at a senior World Table Tennis Championships, at the age of 13.

Hazin competed at the 2019 Pan American Games in Lima, Peru, finishing in the round of 16 in the singles, quarterfinals in the men's doubles and quarterfinals in the men's team event.

In May 2021, Hazin was named to Canada's 2020 Olympic team.

References

2000 births
Canadian male table tennis players
Living people
Sportspeople from Richmond Hill, Ontario
Pan American Games competitors for Canada
Table tennis players at the 2019 Pan American Games
Table tennis players at the 2020 Summer Olympics
Olympic table tennis players of Canada
21st-century Canadian people